Bracegirdle is an English surname that may refer to:
Anne Bracegirdle, English actress (17th / 18th century)
John Bracegirdle, English poet (16th / 17th century)
Lee Bracegirdle, Australian-American composer, orchestral horn player and conductor
Leighton Seymour Bracegirdle, Australian naval officer
Mark Anthony Bracegirdle, Anglo-Australian, political activist, well known in the Sri Lankan context
Nick Bracegirdle - known as Chicane (recording artist)
The name derives from a medieval item of clothing, the breeches girdle